Mont-Saint-Grégoire is a municipality in the province of Quebec, Canada, located in the Regional County Municipality of Le Haut-Richelieu. The population as of the Canada 2011 Census was 3,086. Residents of Mont-Saint-Grégoire are called Grégoriens (Grégoriennes, fem.).

History
Mont-Saint-Grégoire was named for Gregory the Great, pope from 590 to 604, who was succeeded by Sabinian.

Saint André Bessette was born in Mont-Saint-Grégoire.

Demographics

Population

Language

See also
List of municipalities in Quebec

References

External links

 Mont-Saint-Grégoire official website

Municipalities in Quebec
Incorporated places in Le Haut-Richelieu Regional County Municipality
Designated places in Quebec
Populated places established in 1836
1836 establishments in the British Empire